Anthene philo is a butterfly in the family Lycaenidae. It is found in South-east Asia.

Subspecies
Anthene philo philo (Sulawesi, Salayar, Tukangbesi, Banggai, Sula)
Anthene philo scintillans Tite, 1966 (Talaud, Sanghie)

References

Butterflies described in 1874
Anthene
Endemic fauna of Indonesia
Taxa named by Carl Heinrich Hopffer